Waikato Bay of Plenty Magic are a New Zealand netball team based in Hamilton. Between 1999 and 2007, they played in the Coca-Cola Cup/National Bank Cup league. Between 2008 and 2016, they played in the ANZ Championship. Since 2017, Magic have represented Netball Waikato Bay of Plenty in the ANZ Premiership. Netball Waikato Bay of Plenty is the governing body that represents the North Island regions of Waikato and Bay of Plenty. During the National Bank Cup era, Magic were premiers in 2005 and 2006. During the ANZ Championship era, Magic were the most successful New Zealand team. In 2008 they were minor premiers and they were grand finalists in 2008 and 2010 before winning the overall title in 2012. They were the only New Zealand team to win the ANZ Championship.

History

Formation
In 1998 Waikato Wildcats, featuring Jenny-May Coffin, and Bay of Plenty Magic, with Lyn Gunson as head coach, became founder members of the Coca-Cola Cup/National Bank Cup league. In 1999 these two teams merged to become Waikato Bay of Plenty Magic. Gunson became the new team's first coach. Amigene Metcalfe, Tania Nicholson and Cushla Lichtwark were all members of the team's first squad.

Coca-Cola Cup/National Bank Cup
Between 1999 and 2007, Waikato Bay of Plenty Magic played in the Coca-Cola Cup/National Bank Cup league. During this era, they were coached by three future New Zealand national netball team head coaches – Lyn Gunson, Ruth Aitken and Noeline Taurua. In 2005 and 2006, with a team coached by Taurua and featuring Amigene Metcalfe, Irene van Dyk, Casey Williams, Laura Langman and Joline Henry, Magic won two successive National Bank Cup titles. On both occasions they defeated Southern Sting in the grand final.

Statistics

ANZ Championship
Between 2008 and 2016, Magic played in the ANZ Championship. Magic were the most successful New Zealand team during ANZ Championship era. With a team coached by Noeline Taurua, captained by Amigene Metcalfe and featuring Irene van Dyk, Magic finished the 2008 season as minor premiers and overall runners-up. During the regular season Magic won 10 of their 13 matches and finished above eventual champions New South Wales Swifts. Magic subsequently lost to Swifts in  the major semi–final, defeated Adelaide Thunderbirds in the preliminary final before losing the grand final to Swifts. 

In 2009 Magic were regular season runners up. In 2010, Magic were grand finalists once again. They finished the regular season third behind Swifts and  Thunderbirds. They subsequently defeated Southern Steel in the minor semi-final and Swifts in the preliminary final but lost to Thunderbirds in the grand final. In 2011 they were again regular season runners up. 

In 2012, with a team coached by Taurua, captained by Laura Langman and featuring Leana de Bruin, Irene van Dyk, Julianna Naoupu and Casey Williams, Magic eventually won the premiership. Magic lost their first four matches. However, they subsequently won 12 matches in a row to finish third during the regular season and champions overall. In the minor semi-final they defeated Thunderbirds and in the preliminary final they defeated Northern Mystics after extra time. In the grand final they defeated Melbourne Vixens 41–38. As a result, they became the first, and only, New Zealand team to win the Championship. They were also the first and only team to start the season with four defeats and win the title and the first and only team to finish third in the regular season and win the title.

In July 2013, Julie Fitzgerald was appointed head coach of Magic. Between 2014 and 2016, she guided Magic to the ANZ Championship Finals Series every season. In both 2015 and 2016, she guided Magic to the New Zealand Conference titles.

Regular season statistics

ANZ Premiership 
Since 2017, Magic have played in the ANZ Premiership. 

Regular season statistics

Grand finals
National Bank Cup

ANZ Championship

Home venues
Since 2012, Magic's main home venue has been Claudelands Arena, now known as the Globox Arena. They also play home matches at Tauranga's ASB Baypark Stadium and Rotorua's Energy Events Centre. Between 1998 and 2011, Mystery Creek Events Centre served as Magic's main Hamilton home venue. During this era they also played their Tauranga matches at the Queen Elizabeth Youth Centre.

Notable players

2023 squad

Internationals

 Grace Rasmussen
 Hayley Saunders

 Caitlin Bassett
 Kristiana Manu'a
 Jamie-Lee Price
 Peta Scholz

 Jade Clarke
 Joanne Harten

 Julianna Naoupu
 Frances Solia

 Leana de Bruin
 Lenize Potgieter
 Irene van Dyk
 Liezel Wium

Captains

Award winners

ANZ Championship awards
ANZ Championship MVP

Notes
  Laura Langman and Temepara George shared the 2013 award.
  Joanne Harten and Kimberlee Green shared the 2014 award.

ANZ Championship Grand Final MVP

ANZ Championship Best New Talent

Coaches

Head coaches

Assistant coaches

Main sponsors

Reserve teams
National Bank Cup era
During the National Bank Cup era, Magic also had a development team. Its head coaches included Hikitia Gallagher and Rhonda Wilcox while Hayley Stockman was a former player.

National Netball League
Since 2016, Netball Waikato Bay of Plenty have entered a team in the National Netball League. In 2018 and 2019 Waikato Bay of Plenty were NNL grand finalists. However, on both occasions they lost to Central Zone/Central Manawa.

Honours

National Bank Cup
Winners: 2005, 2006
ANZ Championship
Winners: 2012
Runners Up: 2008, 2010
Minor premiers: 2008
ANZ Championship – New Zealand Conference
Winners: 2015, 2016

References

External links
 Official website
  Waikato Bay of Plenty Magic on Facebook

 
Netball teams in New Zealand
ANZ Premiership teams
ANZ Championship teams
National Bank Cup teams
Sports clubs established in 1998
1998 establishments in New Zealand